Nanshi District (was a district located in central Shanghai until its merger with Huangpu District, Shanghai on 13 June 2000.

Location
The former Nanshi District, literally "southern city", was the historical core of Shanghai. It included the old, walled city as well as the nearby docklands on both sides of the Huangpu River. Shanghai County was established at the beginning of the Ming Dynasty. A city wall was built to repel the Wokou, and this Ming Dynasty wall defined the extent of urban Shanghai for the next few centuries.

History
In 1842, the area north of the old city was established as the British concession in Shanghai, which later became the Shanghai International Settlement. At the time, the concession was referred to by locals as the "northern city" while the walled Chinese city was the "southern city". From this reference was later derived the name Nanshi. Upon the defeat of Japan at the end of World War II, a unified municipal administration was established over urban Shanghai for the first time since the mid 19th century.

In 1945, after the Republic of China government took control, the old city was divided into the Third District (Yimiao District) and the Fourth District (Penglai District). In 1959 these were merged to form Nanshi District (with a small part of former Yimiao District merging into Luwan District).

References

See also 
 Huangpu District, Shanghai
 Old City of Shanghai

Districts of Shanghai